Daniel 'Dani' Hedrera Lobatón (born 15 August 1983) is a Spanish footballer who plays for Xerez CD as a central defender.

Club career
Born in Jerez de la Frontera, Andalusia, Hedrera started playing youth football with Xerez CD. In the 2001–02 season he made his senior debuts, appearing with the reserves in the regional leagues; on 27 October 2001 he played his first game as a professional, starting in a 2–0 home win against Elche CF in the Segunda División championship, and he eventually started in all of his first-team appearances during the campaign, as the club finished just three points shy of a La Liga promotion.

Hedrera then joined AD Alcorcón on loan in the 2002 summer, and went on to resume his career in Segunda División B and also Tercera División, representing Real Madrid Castilla, Alcorcón, Pontevedra CF, Zamora CF, Mazarrón CF, Real Oviedo, Polideportivo Ejido and Cultural y Deportiva Leonesa.

References

External links
 
 Futbolme profile  
 

1983 births
Living people
Footballers from Jerez de la Frontera
Spanish footballers
Association football defenders
Segunda División players
Segunda División B players
Tercera División players
Xerez CD B players
Xerez CD footballers
AD Alcorcón footballers
Real Madrid Castilla footballers
Pontevedra CF footballers
Zamora CF footballers
Real Oviedo players
Polideportivo Ejido footballers
Cultural Leonesa footballers
CD Lealtad players
Algeciras CF footballers